Stéphane Zeusnagapa Pounewatchy (born 10 February 1968) is a French former footballer, turned football agent. He was a defender who plied his trade in France, England and Scotland.

Career
Pounewatchy played in his native France for CS Sedan Ardennes from 1985 to 1987, suffering relegation from Ligue 2 in the 1985–86 season. In 1989, he returned to the second tier with FC Martigues and helped them to the Ligue 2 title and promotion to Ligue 1 in 1992–93. The club consolidated their top-flight status in 1993–94 and 1994–95, in part due to Didier Tholot's 13 league goals in both seasons. Pounewatchy spent the 1995–96 season with FC Gueugnon, though both Gueugnon and Martigues suffered relegation to Ligue 2.

Pounewatchy moved to England for the start of the 1996–97 season where he was a permanent fixture in the Third Division Carlisle United team in both 1996–97 and 1997–98. The club celebrated promotion to the Second Division in the former season and relegation from it in the latter. He was named as man of the match as Carlisle won the 1997 Football League Trophy Final at Wembley with a penalty shoot-out victory over Colchester United following a 0–0 draw.

Pounewatchy then briefly moved north to Scotland for the 1997–98 season, spending August with Dundee in the SPL, playing four games before joining Port Vale of the English Football League First Division on a monthly basis. He was only at Vale Park for September, playing just two games. On 20 February, he joined Colchester United, signing a contract to run for the rest of the season. He said: "I am very happy to be in the Second Division because when you are a professional footballer you want to play at the highest level you can." He played fifteen games that season and was released on 8 May.

On 25 January 2000, he turned out for Scunthorpe United in a 2–1 defeat by Chesterfield at Glanford Park in the Football League Trophy.

Career statistics
Source:

Honours
FC Martigues
Ligue 2: 1992–93

Carlisle United
Football League Trophy: 1997
Football League Third Division third-place promotion: 1996–97

References

Footballers from Paris
French footballers
Association football defenders
CS Sedan Ardennes players
FC Martigues players
FC Gueugnon players
French expatriate footballers
Expatriate footballers in England
Carlisle United F.C. players
Expatriate footballers in Scotland
Dundee F.C. players
Port Vale F.C. players
Colchester United F.C. players
Scunthorpe United F.C. players
Ligue 1 players
Ligue 2 players
Scottish Premier League players
English Football League players
Association football agents
1968 births
Living people